The home counties are the counties of England that surround London. The counties are not precisely defined but Buckinghamshire and Surrey are usually included in definitions and Berkshire, Essex, Hertfordshire and Kent are also often included. Other counties further from London — such as Bedfordshire, Cambridgeshire, Hampshire, Oxfordshire, East Sussex and West Sussex — are not normally regarded as home counties, although on occasion may be thought of as such due to their proximity to London and their connection to the London regional economy.

Etymology
The origin of the term "home counties" is uncertain. Marcus Crouch, writing in 1975, thought that it derived from the Home Counties Circuit of courts that since at least the 18th century had surrounded London. Looking further back, he suggested that it included the counties in which, since Tudor times, it has been possible for civil servants and politicians to have their country homes and still be able to travel into London without excessive delay when they were needed. A distant Anglo-Saxon origin has also been speculated.

Composition 

The earliest use of the term cited in the Oxford English Dictionary is from 1695. Charles Davenant, in An essay upon ways and means of supplying the war, wrote, "The Eleven Home Counties, which are thought in Land Taxes to pay more than their proportion, viz. Surry [sic] with Southwark, Hertfordshire, Bedfordshire, Cambridgeshire, Kent, Essex, Norfolk, and Suffolk, Berks, Bucks, and Oxfordshire."

Later definitions have tended to be more narrow and Bacon's Large Scale Atlas of London and Suburbs (revised edition c. 1912) includes Berkshire, Buckingham, Essex, Hertford, Kent, Middlesex and Surrey in the "maps of the home counties".

In reviewing S. P. B. Mais's The Home Counties (Batsford The Face of Britain series, 1942), Norah Richardson noted that "the home counties" was a term in constant use but hard to define, but that Mais's definition of "the five counties around London County - Middlesex, Hertfordshire, Essex, Kent and Surrey" could not be improved upon.

The term is sometimes understood to mean those counties which, on their borders closest to London, have been partly subsumed into London. Indeed, the former county of Middlesex has been almost wholly within London since 1965 as have parts of Kent, Hertfordshire and Surrey, although the county continues to exist as a cultural and historic entity.

The third edition of the Oxford English Dictionary (2010) defines the term as "the English counties surrounding London, into which London has extended. They comprise chiefly Essex, Kent, Surrey, and Hertfordshire." Parts of all of those historic counties are, since 1965, officially within London, although no part of Berkshire, Buckinghamshire or Sussex is. The county of Sussex is also wholly outside, and Berkshire almost wholly outside, the route of the M25 motorway, which is often treated as an unofficial perimeter of Greater London, and some definitions mention that those counties are not always included amongst the home counties, or that the term has been extended to include them.

Inhabitants
The home counties have been characterised as being "inhabited on the whole by 'nice', comfortable, and conformist middle-class people" (1987) exemplified by the county of Surrey which has been described as possessing quintessential home counties characteristics of "a comfortable plasticized commuterland with respectable villas and neatly mown lawns interspersed with patches of mild scenery". In fiction, the character of Margot Leadbetter in the BBC sitcom The Good Life, set in Surbiton, formerly in Surrey, has been described by The Spectator as "a Home Counties Conservative to her fingertips".

Marcus Crouch, however, has made the point that the home counties have been more affected by migration from within and without the United Kingdom than any other region of the country, making them the most cosmopolitan region of England and meaning that there is no typical home counties inhabitant. One result of this diversity, he argues, is that local loyalties are shallower in the home counties than in, for instance, Yorkshire or parts of Scotland where there has been less population mobility.

Geography
Marcus Crouch has identified one of the principal characteristics of the home counties as being a shared chalk geology that is broadly mirrored north and south of the Thames.

Economy
The home counties are some of the wealthiest in Britain with the towns of Virginia Water, Esher and Weybridge, all in Surrey, ranked in one 2019 survey as having some of the highest average house prices in the country. However, a 2011 report described the perception that South East England, the official region of England in which most of the home counties are located, was universally wealthy as inaccurate and noted that 500,000 people in the region lived in areas that were within the 20% most deprived areas in the country with deprivation concentrated in coastal areas such as Margate (Kent) and Hastings (East Sussex). Significant areas of deprivation were also found in the urban areas of south Hampshire and Slough.

In official use

Multiple definitions of the term have been used in legislation and by official bodies. In the twentieth century, for instance, as follows: (the table includes all the areas mentioned above):
 1908: The Home Counties Division of the Territorial Force comprised units recruiting in Middlesex, Kent, Surrey and Sussex.
 1920: The London and Home Counties Electricity District consisted of the counties of London and Middlesex; and parts of Berkshire, Buckinghamshire, Essex, Hertfordshire, Kent and Surrey.
1924: The London and Home Counties Traffic Advisory Committee, covering the London Traffic Area: London, Middlesex, and parts of Buckinghamshire, Essex, Hertfordshire, Kent, and Surrey.
1926: The Home Counties (Music and Dancing) Licensing Act regulated activities in all parts of Buckinghamshire, Essex, Hertfordshire, Kent and Surrey within 20 miles of the City of London or City of Westminster.
1938: Green Belt (London and Home Counties) Act limited development in parts of Middlesex, Kent, Buckinghamshire, Surrey, Essex, Berkshire, and Hertfordshire.
1948: The Home Counties Brigade was formed to administer the infantry regiments of the City and County of London, Kent, Middlesex, Surrey, and Sussex.
1995: The Valuation Office rating manual defined both inner and outer home counties, with the inner home counties being defined as inside the M25 motorway. The outer home counties included Kent, Surrey, Sussex, Buckinghamshire, Berkshire, Bedfordshire, Essex, Hertfordshire, Oxfordshire, Hampshire. Parts of Dorset and Cambridgeshire were included in the outer home counties with Bournemouth and Cambridge being home counties exclaves.

See also 
 Bibliography of the home counties
 London commuter belt
 Metro-land
 Suburbia

Notes

References

Sources

External links

The Association of British Counties
Why are the counties around London called the "Home counties"? The Guardian

 
Counties of England
Geography of London
Geography of Berkshire
Geography of Buckinghamshire
Geography of Essex
Geography of Hertfordshire
Geography of Kent
Geography of Surrey
Geography of Sussex
Greater London
Southern England
Vernacular geography